SOCSD may refer to:
 Sibley-Ocheyedan Community School District - Iowa
 South Orangetown Central School District - New York
 Starkville Oktibbeha Consolidated School District - Mississippi